Makó is a district in south-eastern part of Csongrád County. Makó is also the name of the town where the district seat is found. The district is located in the Southern Great Plain Statistical Region.

Geography 
Makó District borders with Hódmezővásárhely District and Orosháza District (Békés County) to the north, the Romanian counties of Arad to the east and Timiș to the south, Szeged District to the west. The number of the inhabited places in Makó District is 15.

Municipalities 
The district has 2 towns, 1 large village and 12 villages.
(ordered by population, as of 1 January 2012)

The bolded municipalities are cities, italics municipality is large village.

Demographics

In 2011, it had a population of 45,138 and the population density was 66/km².

Ethnicity
Besides the Hungarian majority, the main minorities are the Roma (approx. 1,200), Romanian (650), Slovak (200), German (150) and Serb (100).

Total population (2011 census): 45,138
Ethnic groups (2011 census): Identified themselves: 43,043 persons:
Hungarians: 40,574 (94.26%)
Gypsies: 1,101 (2.56%)
Romanians: 662 (1.54%)
Others and indefinable: 706 (1.64%)
Approx. 2,000 persons in Makó District did not declare their ethnic group at the 2011 census.

Religion
Religious adherence in the county according to 2011 census:

Catholic – 17,365 (Roman Catholic – 16,535; Greek Catholic – 827);
Reformed – 5,187;
Evangelical – 411;
Orthodox – 292;
other religions – 675; 
Non-religious – 11,672; 
Atheism – 464;
Undeclared – 9,072.

Gallery

See also
List of cities and towns of Hungary

References

External links
 Postal codes of the Makó District

Districts in Csongrád-Csanád County